The third cabinet of Gheorghe Tătărăscu was the government of Romania from 29 August 1936 to 14 November 1937.

Ministers
The ministers of the cabinet were as follows:

President of the Council of Ministers:
Gheorghe Tătărăscu (29 August 1936 - 14 November 1937)
Vice President of the Council of Ministers:
Ion Inculeț (29 August 1936 - 14 November 1937)
Minister of the Interior:
Dumitru Iuca (29 August 1936 - 23 February 1937)
Gheorghe Tătărăscu (23 February - 14 November 1937)
Minister of Foreign Affairs: 
Victor Antonescu (29 August 1936 - 14 November 1937)
Minister of Finance:
Mircea Cancicov (29 August 1936 - 14 November 1937)
Minister of Justice:
Mircea Djuvara (29 August 1936 - 23 February 1937)
Vasile P. Sassu (23 February - 14 November 1937)
Minister of National Defence:
Gen. Paul Angelescu (29 August 1936 - 28 August 1937)
(interim) Radu Irimescu (28 August - 4 September 1937)
Gen. Constantin Ilasievici (4 September - 14 November 1937)
Minister of Armaments:
Gheorghe Tătărăscu (29 August 1936 - 23 February 1937)
Minister of Air and Marine:
Nicolae Caranfil (13 November 1936 - 1 January 1937)
(interim) Gheorghe Tătărăscu (1 - 7 January 1937)
Radu Irimescu (7 January - 14 November 1937)
Minister of Agriculture and Property
Vasile P. Sassu (29 August 1936 - 23 February 1937)
(interim) Vasile P. Sassu (23 February - 14 November 1937)
Minister of Industry and Commerce:
Valeriu Pop (29 August 1936 - 14 November 1937)
Minister of Public Works and Communications:
Richard Franasovici (29 August 1936 - 14 November 1937)
Minister of Public Instruction:
Constantin Angelescu (29 August 1936 - 14 November 1937)
Minister of Religious Affairs and the Arts:
Victor Iamandi (29 August 1936 - 9 March 1937)
Minister of Labour:
Ion Nistor (9 August 1936 - 14 November 1937)
Minister of Health and Social Security
Ion Costinescu (9 August 1936 - 14 November 1937)
Minister of State with responsibility for Cooperation: 
Mihail Negură (29 August 1936 - 14 November 1937)

Ministers of State:
Alexandru Lapedatu (29 August 1936 - 14 November 1937)
Dumitru Iuca (23 February - 7 April 1937)
Mircea Djuvara (23 February - 7 April 1937)

References

Cabinets of Romania
Cabinets established in 1936
Cabinets disestablished in 1937
1936 establishments in Romania
1937 disestablishments in Romania